Pratyaksha in Hinduism is one of the three principal means of knowledge, it means that which is present before the eyes clear, distinct and evident.

Meaning
Pratyaksha (Sanskrit: प्रत्यक्ष IAST: pratyakṣa) literally means that which is perceptible to the eye or visible, in general usage it refers to being present, present before the eye i.e. within the range of sight, cognizable by any sense organ, distinct, evident, clear, direct, immediate, explicit, express, corporeal; it is a Pramana, mode of proof. The Nyaya School recognizes Pratyaksha (perception) as a kind of pramana along with Anumana (inference), Upamana (comparison) and Shabda (verbal testimony); this school recognizes these four kinds only. The Sankhya School does not recognize Upamana as a pramana.  To these four auxiliaries which help illuminate things the Vedantins and the Mimamsakas also add Anupalabdhi (non-apprehension) and Arthapatti (presumption)as valid pramanas.

Means of knowledge

Pratyaksha is one of the three principal means of knowledge. The three principal means of knowledge are – 1) Anumana, inference from data, which depends for its value on the possession of the right data, on the right observation of the data including the drawing of the right analogies, the unerring perception of true identity and rejection of false identity, the just estimate of difference and contrast, and on the power of right reasoning from the right data; 2) Pratyaksha which is the process of collecting and knowing the data, and 3) Aptavakya which is evidence, the testimony of men in possession of the sought after knowledge.

Implication

Pratyaksha refers to the faculties of perception with which are connected thoughts (Chinta), imagination (Kalpana) and volition (Praytna), which four together as Chetas illuminate the Manas, the ordinary mental equipment of the individual, and give awareness or consciousness (Chetna).  There are four types of valid perceptions – a) Indriya pratyaksha or sense perception, b) Manas pratyaksha or mental perception, c) Svavedana pratyaksha or self-consciousness, and d) Yoga pratyaksha or super normal intuition. In sense perception, which is an indeterminate perception the chittashakti (intelligence-energy) acts as the substratum of the senses. Mental perception arises when chittashakti, with the aid of Buddhi, reflects upon objects of senses, and is a determinate perception. Self-consciousness arises when, directed by the tattvas or panchakoshas, raga (attachment), vidya (knowledge), niyati (order of things), kala (time) and kalpa (the elements) along with pleasure and pain become objects of knowledge to chit, the intelligence of the self. Super normal intuition is gained after removal of impurities cover the intelligent-self through practice of the eight-fold yogic-discipline.

Pratyaksha knowledge can be gained through a) Worldly pratyaksha, externally through the five senses and internally through mind, and b) Transcendental pratyaksha which is divided into Samanya, Lakshana, Gyana lakshana and Yogaja. Pratyaksha  (apparent  or obvious) is divided into Savikalpa, Nirvikalpa and Pratibhigya. Pratyaksha knowledge is intuitive in nature and in Yoga and Vedanta is also known as Aparokshanubhuti.

References

Hindu philosophical concepts
Vedanta
Upanishadic concepts
Yoga concepts
Buddhist philosophical concepts
Sanskrit words and phrases